Ronen Bar is the director of Shin Bet since 13 October 2021. He previously served as deputy head of Shin Bet. Bar was appointed by Prime Minister Naftali Bennett and his nomination was approved by Israel's cabinet on 11 October 2021. He assumed office on 13 October 2021.

Biography
Bar served in the Israel Defense Forces’ Sayeret Matkal unit. He joined Shin Bet as a field agent in 1993, and in 2011 was named head of Shin Bet's Operations Division. Bar became head of the resource development department in 2016, and became Shin Bet deputy chief in 2018.

Bar is expected to serve as director until 2026.

Personal life
Bar was age 55 when he was appointed in 2021.

References

External links

Directors of the Shin Bet
Living people
Israeli Jews
Year of birth missing (living people)